Mamadou Bah (born 11 July 1962) is a Guinean judoka. He competed in the men's extra-lightweight event at the 1992 Summer Olympics.

References

1962 births
Living people
Guinean male judoka
Olympic judoka of Guinea
Judoka at the 1992 Summer Olympics
Place of birth missing (living people)